Sydney Martineau (6 January 1863 – 19 December 1945) was a British fencer who took part in the 1912 Olympics in Stockholm, and the Fencing at the 1908 Summer Olympics – Men's épée.

Career
Martineau won an Olympic silver medal in fencing at the 1912 Olympics in Stockholm. He was part of the British team which came in second place, behind Belgium, in the team epee competition.

References

1863 births
1945 deaths
British male fencers
Fencers at the 1908 Summer Olympics
Fencers at the 1912 Summer Olympics
Olympic fencers of Great Britain
Olympic silver medallists for Great Britain
Olympic medalists in fencing
People from Clapham
Medalists at the 1912 Summer Olympics